The 1982–83 Kentucky Wildcats men's basketball team represented University of Kentucky in the 1982–83 NCAA Division I men's basketball season. The head coach was Joe B. Hall and the team finished the season with an overall record of 23–8.

Roster

Schedule and results

|-
!colspan=9 style=| Regular Season

|-
!colspan=9 style=| SEC Tournament

|-
!colspan=9 style=| NCAA Tournament

Rankings

References 

Kentucky Wildcats men's basketball seasons
Kentucky
Kentucky
Kentucky Wildcats
Kentucky Wildcats